Thamil Arasu Ambumamee is a Malaysian footballer from Banting, Selangor  who plays as a forward.

He was once was called up to play for the Malaysian senior team on 22 November 2010 for the 2010 AFF Suzuki Cup after Ahmad Fakri Saarani was injured. But later, Thamil was not included at the final 22-man squad for the 2010 AFF Suzuki Cup.

Individual honours
 AFF U-19 Youth Championship Top Scorer (1): 2009

References

External links
  Football Biography – Thamil Arasu Abumamee
  AFF U-19 Championship Class Strikers
 

1991 births
Living people
People from Selangor
Malaysian footballers
Malaysia international footballers
Selangor FA players
Malaysian people of Tamil descent
Malaysian sportspeople of Indian descent
Malaysia Super League players
Association football forwards
Southeast Asian Games gold medalists for Malaysia
Southeast Asian Games medalists in football
Competitors at the 2011 Southeast Asian Games